Kenan Hasagić (born 1 February 1980) is a Bosnian retired professional football goalkeeper and current goalkeeping coach of Bosnian Premier League club Željezničar.

Club career
Hasagić's football career began in his hometown with Rudar Kakanj. At the age of 16, he made his debut in a first division match. He concedeed 5 goals. He was the most promising goalkeeper in Bosnia and Herzegovina, he played for youth selections and was later transferred to Austrian side Vorwärts Steyr.

After that, Hasagić was a member of Altay in Turkey but didn't see much first team football. He went back to Bosnia and played for Rudar Kakanj and Bosna Visoko. In 2003, he signed a contract with Željezničar. Here he found good form and even became first choice goalkeeper for the Bosnia and Herzegovina national team.

During the 2004–05 season, he moved to Turkey once again where he signed for Turkish Süper Lig side Gaziantepspor. In 2007, he moved over to another Turkish Süper Lig side in İstanbul Başakşehir. In 2012, Hasagić retired from football early after injuries shattered his career.

International career

Hasagić made his debut for Bosnia and Herzegovina in a September 2002 European Championship qualification match against Romania and has earned a total of 44 caps, scoring no goals. His final international was an October 2011 European Championship qualification match against France.

Managerial career
In August 2017, Hasagić became the new goalkeeping coach of Bosnian Premier League club Mladost Doboj Kakanj. Two years later, on 2 November 2019, he announced that he left Mladost and that he will only be focusing on the Bosnia and Herzegovina national team.

On 4 January 2018, after Robert Prosinečki was named the new head coach of the Bosnia and Herzegovina national team, it was announced that Hasagić became the new goalkeeping coach of the national team. Hasagić left the national team in November 2019 with the sacking of Prosinečki.

It was announced on 7 January 2020 that Hasagić took over the position of goalkeeping coach of another Bosnian Premier League club, Tuzla City, working alongside former national team teammate, good friend, and godfather Elvir Baljić, the club manager at the time. He decided to leave the club in June 2021.

On 9 July 2021, Hasagić became the new goalkeeping coach of his former club Željezničar.

Personal life
In 1998, Hasagić met his future wife, Dijana, in Jablanica. They were married in 2000. They have three daughters together: Ilda, Iman and Inam. On 27 December 2009, Hasagić confirmed he divorced his wife Dijana after 9 years of marriage.

After his divorce, he has been in a long term relationship with a model, Aminka Sivac. He is 15 years older than her. On 8 July 2019, Hasagić married Sivac. Former national team teammate Elvir Baljić was the best man at his wedding.

Career statistics

International
Source:

Honours

Player
Željezničar
Bosnian Cup: 2002–03

References

External links

Kenan Hasagić at TFF.org

1980 births
Living people
People from Kakanj
Bosniaks of Bosnia and Herzegovina
Association football goalkeepers
Bosnia and Herzegovina footballers
Bosnia and Herzegovina international footballers
FK Rudar Kakanj players
SK Vorwärts Steyr players
Altay S.K. footballers
NK Bosna Visoko players
FK Željezničar Sarajevo players
Gaziantepspor footballers
İstanbul Başakşehir F.K. players
Premier League of Bosnia and Herzegovina players
Austrian Football Bundesliga players
Süper Lig players
TFF First League players
First League of the Federation of Bosnia and Herzegovina players
Bosnia and Herzegovina expatriate footballers
Expatriate footballers in Austria
Bosnia and Herzegovina expatriate sportspeople in Austria
Expatriate footballers in Turkey
Bosnia and Herzegovina expatriate sportspeople in Turkey
Association football goalkeeping coaches